Leo Ditrichstein (January 6, 1865 – June 28, 1928) was an Austrian-American actor and playwright.

Biography
He was born on January 6, 1865, in Temesvár, Austria-Hungary.  He was educated in Vienna and was naturalized as an American citizen in 1897. His grandfather was Hungarian novelist József Eötvös who is sometimes listed as Joseph von Etooes.

He made his New York début in Die Ehre (1890).  This was followed by Mr. Wilkinson's Widows, Trilby, Are You a Mason? and other plays. He was the author of numerous plays, among which are:  Gossip (with Clyde Fitch, 1895);  A Southern Romance (1897);  The Last Appeal (1901);  What's the Matter with Susan? (1904);  The Ambitious Mrs. Susan (1907);  The Million (from the French, 1911);  The Concert (1910);  Temperamental Journey (1912);  The Great Lover (1915); The Judge of Zalmea (1917). Ditrichstein appeared in one motion picture, in a cameo as himself, in How Molly Made Good (1915).  

Some of the plays Ditrichstein either wrote or acted in have been made into motion pictures. The Divorce Game (1917) was based on his play Mlle. Fifi.

He died on June 28, 1928, from heart disease at the Auersperg sanitarium in Vienna.

References
NOTE: I could not find Leo Ditrichstein in the New. International Encyclopedia.

External links

IBDB
Portraits of Leo Ditrichstein; NY Public Library, Billy Rose collection
In The Phantom Rival 1915 with Laura Hope Crews

Austro-Hungarian emigrants to the United States
American dramatists and playwrights
American male stage actors
1865 births
1928 deaths